Amerila bipartita is a moth of the  subfamily Arctiinae. It is found in Tanzania, Kenya, Malawi, Mozambique, Zimbabwe and South Africa.

References

Moths described in 1910
Amerilini
Moths of Africa
Insects of Tanzania